Andrii Leonidovych Derkach (born 19 August 1967) is a Ukrainian politician and businessman. He has been a member of the Ukrainian Parliament from 1998 to January 2023, serving seven terms, with several parties. In 2021, the United States Government accused him of being a "Russian agent" and sanctioned him for interference in the 2020 United States elections, and the Ukrainian government sanctioned him for spreading Russian propaganda. In June 2022, the Security Service of Ukraine (SBU) said that Derkach received funds from the Russian GRU to create private security companies that Russia planned to use to capture Ukraine, and that Prosecutor General of Ukraine had started a pre-trial investigation into his role.

In August 2020, U.S. counterintelligence chief William Evanina identified Derkach as a key participant in Russian efforts to harm Joe Biden's candidacy in the 2020 U.S. presidential election. United States intelligence community analysis released in March 2021 found that Derkach was among proxies of Russian intelligence who promoted and laundered misleading or unsubstantiated narratives about Biden "to US media organizations, US officials, and prominent US individuals, including some close to former President Trump and his administration." Trump's personal attorney Rudy Giuliani met with Derkach in December 2019.

Early life and education 
Derkach was born on 19 August 1967 in Dnipropetrovsk, Ukrainian SSR, the son of KGB officer Leonid Derkach, who headed the State Customs Committee and later the Security Service of Ukraine intelligence agency from 1998-2003. Derkach was fired in 2001 for his alleged involvement in the murder of journalist Georgiy Gongadze. Ihor Smeshko, the head of Ukraine's SBU from 2003-2005 who replaced Leonid Derkach, maintained a close relationship with the FBI and kept close watch on the Derkachs. In 2005, the report of an ad hoc committee formed via the Ukrainian parliament, primarily responsible for investigating the murder, concluded that Gongadze's murder had been organized; the primary conspirators remained identified as then-President Kuchma and his Minister of the Interior, in addition to Leonid Derkach, who, according to the committee, had been involved in the crime.

Derkach attended the Kharkiv Higher Military Command Engineering School, graduating in 1989. In 1989 and 1990, he served in the Strategic Missile Force at the technical missile base of the Pervomaysk division; this division was under the command of the Strategic Missile Force.  In 1993, he graduated with a Ph.D. in Law from the Dzerzhinsky Higher School of the KGB, (later renamed the FSB Academy), with a thesis titled "Organizing and Holding Meetings with Secret Agents".

Career 
In 1993 after graduation from the FSB Academy, Derkach worked as Security Officer at the Office of Security Service of Ukraine in the Dnipropetrovsk Oblast (province).

The Derkach family was very close to Leonid Kuchma who worked side by side with Leonid Derkach producing Satan rockets at the Yuzhmash factory, and, after Kuchma became president of Ukraine in 1994, the Derkachs gained political positions through their relationships with Kuchma. The Derkachs are part of the Dnipr Clan known as the Derkach group which maintains very close relationships with Oleg Deripaska, Mikhail Fridman's Moscow based Alfa Group and Petr Aven's Alfa-Bank.

From 1994 to 1996, he served as Deputy Director of the Control Service of the President of Ukraine. From 1996 to 1997 he was Advisor to the President of Ukraine on Foreign Economic Affairs. In 1997 and 1998 he was  First Assistant to the Prime Minister of Ukraine. Derkach served as President of the national nuclear generating company Energoatom from 2006 to 2007. He served as Director General of the State Concern "Ukratomprom" in 2007. From 2011 to 2013, he served pro bono as Chief Advisor to then Prime Minister of Ukraine Mykola Azarov. Despite no longer having an official role, Derkach remains involved in the management of Energoatom, making strategic decisions alongside Oleg Boyarintsev and Herman Galushchenko.

In 2003, both Andrii and Leonid Derkach were implicated in numerous illegal weapons transfers to the Balkans, Asia and Africa including to Iraq, the Taliban, al-Qaeda, al-Shabaab, and Liberia.

Derkach was implicated in the government's orchestration of the Euromaidan assault by security forces on peaceful demonstrators in Kyiv on 11 December 2013.

Business holdings and interests
Germany's Federal Agency for Civic Education reported in 2007 that Derkach and his father Leonid led The Derkach Group, one of the regional cross-industry holding companies formed in Ukraine following the collapse of the Soviet Union. The Derkach Group had close ties to the political elite and attempted to influence politics through lobbying, corrupt networks, and illegal appropriations. Derkach also headed a media company the "Ukrainian Press Group" consisting of four newspapers, a TV guide, and the website версії.com.

According to Media Ownership Monitor Ukraine, Derkach "de facto owns" television channel TRK Era and Radio Era; officially the owner is his assistant Anton Oleksandrovych Simonenko while Derkach is listed as honorary president of Era-Media and head of the arts council of TRK Еra. Ownership data of the privately held company is not publicly available. Radio Era was one of several radio stations, most prominently among them Petro Poroshenko's Channel 5, that provided around-the-clock reporting from Maidan Nezalezhnosti during the Orange Revolution in 2004.

According to anti-corruption watchdog organization Chesno, Derkach and his associates illegally appropriated 42 hectares of protected lands valued at tens of millions of dollars. Derkach also failed to declare his wife's stake in various of his business enterprises, as he was obliged to do under the Ukrainian law to prevent corruption.

Derkach often lobbies for Oleg Deripaska's Russia company Rusal (formerly Russkiy alyuminiy) and has ties to Anatoly Chubais and Chubais' monopolistic electricity supplier, RAO UES.

Parliamentary activity 

Derkach has been a member of the Ukrainian Parliament from 1998 to the present. He was first elected in the 1998 Ukrainian parliamentary election in District 159 (at the same time he ran for Laborious Ukraine Electoral Bloc which did not win any seats). In parliament he joins the Labour Ukraine faction.

In the 2002 Ukrainian parliamentary election Derkach was elected as №11 in the election list of For United Ukraine!. In June 2002 however he joined the re-created Labour Ukraine faction.

From 2002 to 2006, he served as Deputy Chairman of the Ukrainian Parliament Committee on Fuel and Energy Complex, Nuclear Policy and Nuclear Safety.

Derkach returned to parliament in the 2006 Ukrainian parliamentary election by being №9 on the election list of Socialist Party of Ukraine.

In the 2007 Ukrainian parliamentary election Derkach was elected on the party list of the Party of Regions; №96 on the list.

In 2012 he was re-elected into parliament as a candidate of Party of Regions in electoral districts (first-past-the-post electoral system) 159. Derkach won the district with 63.37% of the votes. In 2012 he became been a member of the Budget Committee of the Ukrainian Parliament (Committee of the Verkhovna Rada on issues of budget). He left the faction of Party of Regions on 21 February 2014.

In 2014 Derkach was re-elected into parliament as an independent candidate again in District 159. He won the district with 61.85% of the votes.

From 2014 to 2016, he was Deputy Chairman of the Parliamentary Group "Nation's Will".

According to Ukrainian anti-corruption watchdog organization Chesno, Derkach voted for the "dictatorship laws", ten laws restricting freedom of speech and assembly, which were signed into law by president Viktor Yanukovych in January 2014; nine of them were repealed by the Ukrainian parliament 12 days later.

As of October 2019, Derkach represents District 159 situated around Hlukhiv in the Sumy Oblast in northeastern Ukraine. In the 2019 Ukrainian parliamentary election he won the district with 40.65% of the votes. Following the election he did not become a member of any parliamentary committee.

In the Sumy Oblast 2020 local election Derkach headed the list for the Sumy Oblast Council for Our Land. Although the party won 8 seats in the election, Derkach did not take his seat in this provincial council.

On 20 August 2021 the National Security and Defense Council of Ukraine imposed personal economic restrictive sanctions against Derkach on the grounds he was a "pro-Russian propagandist".

On 10 January 2023, Derkach was stripped of his Ukrainian citizenship along with his associates Viktor Medvedchuk and Taras Kozak.

On 13 January 2023, a constitutional majority of members of Ukraine’s parliament voted to strip Derkach of his position as a people’s deputy.

Social activities 
In the fall of 2020, Derkach was president of the 18th Pokrov International Orthodox Film Festival, which promoted peace and friendship with Russia.

In February 2021, he wrote a letter to Ecumenical Patriarch Bartholomew asking him not to come to Ukraine with a "plan of aggression" for the 30th anniversary of Ukrainian independence. Patriarch Warfield's visit to Ukraine did take place. In addition, in the letter, Derkach asked Patriarch Bartholomew to take part in the new "Amman" and only then go to Ukraine with a "road map".

Interference in United States 2020 elections

Money laundering allegations
On 9 October 2019, Derkach alleged that Joe Biden had been involved in an international money laundering scheme with Ukrainian energy company Burisma Holdings and US-based Rosemont Seneca Partners. He claimed that Burisma's payments to four of its board members–including Biden's son Hunter–which were neither secret nor illegal, were "a sinister plot involving" Ukraine's former president Poroshenko but his claims initially were mostly ignored in Ukraine and abroad. Anders Åslund, senior fellow at the Atlantic Council, called Derkach "not credible" and a "professional disinformer."

Meeting with Giuliani
On 5 December 2019, Derkach met with President Donald Trump's personal lawyer Rudy Giuliani in Kyiv to put together a corruption case against Biden's son Hunter, according to Derkach. In May 2020, he released a portion of a phone call between Joe Biden and Petro Poroshenko, the former president of Ukraine.

Documentary: The Ukraine Hoax: Impeachment, Biden Cash, and Mass Murder with guest host Michael Caputo
Derkach, Konstantin Kilimnik, who is a member of the Russian intelligence community and an associate of Paul Manafort who described Kilimnik as Manafort's "Russian Brain", and Andrii Telizhenko, who is a close associate of Rudy Giuliani, supported Michael Caputo, who was producer, and Sergey Petrushin, who is a Russian co-producer that lives in Miami and a close associate of Caputo for over 25 years, making the documentary film The Ukraine Hoax: Impeachment, Biden Cash, and Mass Murder with guest host Michael Caputo which aired on the One America News Network (OANN) on 21 January 2020 only two weeks before the Senate's acquittal of Donald Trump after his first impeachment trial.

Summer 2020 Senate hearings
During the summer of 2020, the United States Senate Homeland Security and Governmental Affairs, which was chaired by Ron Johnson, held hearings into the relationships among Burisma, Mykola Zlochevsky, and the Bidens. Blue Star Strategies is a public relations firm that had worked for Burisma. A contractor with Blue Star Strategies, Andrii Telizhenko was likely to be subpoenaed for testimony during the United States Senate investigations but the Republican plan involving his testimony was cancelled just before he would have testified to the Senate because of his ties to Andrii Derkach.

U.S. sanctions
On 10 September 2020, the U.S. Treasury Department sanctioned Derkach "for attempting to influence the U.S. electoral process," while also alleging that Derkach "ha[d] been an active Russian agent for over a decade, maintaining close connections with the Russian Intelligence Services." The sanctions include freezing all of Derkach's property interests subject to U.S. jurisdiction and prohibiting U.S. persons from engaging in transactions with him and with entities of which Derkach owns 50 percent or more. The Treasury Department applied sanctions against Derkach associates on January 11, 2021, with Treasury secretary Steven Mnuchin saying in a statement, "Russian disinformation campaigns targeting American citizens are a threat to our democracy. The United States will continue to aggressively defend the integrity of our election systems and processes." The January 2021 sanctions also sanctioned the "former Ukrainian Government officials Konstantin Kulyk, Oleksandr Onyshchenko, Andriy Telizhenko, and current Ukraine Member of Parliament Oleksandr Dubinsky" as part of "Derkach's inner circle".

U.S. federal investigations 
In April 2021, Forensic News reported that Derkach came under the scrutiny of prosecutors investigating Russian interference in the presidential election in 2020. “I have been briefed that prosecutors are scrutinizing Derkach as part of the Giuliani probe,” attorney Kenneth McCallion told Forensic News.

The New York Times later confirmed that prosecutors were investigating whether Derkach and other Ukrainians "helped orchestrate a wide-ranging plan to meddle in the 2020 presidential campaign, including using Rudolph W. Giuliani to spread their misleading claims about President Biden and tilt the election in Donald J. Trump's favor."

Other engagements 
From 2010 to 2013 he was a member of the Inter-Council Presence of the Russian Orthodox Church.

In May 2021 Facebook took a Ukrainian influence-for-hire network offline. Facebook attributed the network to organizations and consultants linked to Ukrainian politicians including Andriy Derkach.

Honors and recognition 
 Commander of the Order of Merit of the Italian Republic

See also
Trump–Ukraine scandal
Veracity of statements by Donald Trump

Notes

References

External links 
 
 
 Statement by NCSC Director William Evanina: Election Threat Update for the American Public, August 7, 2020
 Andriy Derkach and his tapes. About one special operation to interfere in the US presidential election, Inform Napalm, 10/08/2020

1967 births
Living people
Businesspeople from Dnipro
Politicians from Dnipro
Third convocation members of the Verkhovna Rada
Fourth convocation members of the Verkhovna Rada
Fifth convocation members of the Verkhovna Rada
Sixth convocation members of the Verkhovna Rada
Seventh convocation members of the Verkhovna Rada
Eighth convocation members of the Verkhovna Rada
Ninth convocation members of the Verkhovna Rada
Labour Ukraine politicians
Socialist Party of Ukraine politicians
Party of Regions politicians
Independent politicians in Ukraine
Our Land (Ukraine) politicians
Recipients of the Order of Merit (Ukraine), 3rd class
Energoatom
People who lost Ukrainian citizenship
Stateless people
Expelled members of the Verkhovna Rada